"All Night" is the third single by American rapper Big Boi for his third studio album, Boomiverse. It was released as a single on July 17, 2017. The song features guest vocals from American rapper Lunchmoney Lewis. It charted on the Billboard Bubbling Under Hot 100 chart at No. 16. The song is his highest charting single as a solo artist. It also charted internationally in the UK, France, and Japan. The song is played in the key of C♭ major, and in common time at 136 beats per minute.

Background
"All Night" is a song about letting the girl choose what she wants to do. The song was featured in an iPhone X commercial in November 2017. The Guardian saw the song as "simultaneously too wacky and too obvious" and "a moment to cringe at, but for the most part this is dad rap that can hold its head high."

Music video
A music video for the single "All Night" was released on June 1, 2018. The visual features Big Boi helping a man set up for a date night.

Charts

Weekly charts

Year-end charts

Certifications

References

2017 songs
2017 singles
LunchMoney Lewis songs
Songs written by Chloe Angelides
Songs written by Dr. Luke
Songs written by Cirkut (record producer)
Songs written by LunchMoney Lewis
Song recordings produced by Dr. Luke
Song recordings produced by Cirkut (record producer)